The 2015 Women's Ford National Hockey League was the 17th edition of the women's field hockey tournament. The competition was held in 9 cities across New Zealand, from 29 August to 20 September. 

Auckland won the title for the sixth time, defeating Northland 6–0 in the final. Midlands finished in third place after winning the third place match 7–4 over Canterbury.

Participating Teams
The following eight teams competed for the title:

 Auckland
 Canterbury
 Capital
 Central
 Midlands
 Northland
 North Harbour
 Southern

Results

Preliminary round

Fixtures

Classification round

Fifth to eighth place classification

Crossover

Seventh and eighth place

Fifth and sixth place

First to fourth place classification

Semi-finals

Third and fourth place

Final

Awards

Statistics

Final standings

Goalscorers

References

External links
Official website

Hockey
Ford National Hockey League
New Zealand National Hockey League seasons
Women's field hockey in New Zealand